The John E. Turner House, at 401 E. 10th St. in Holdenville, Oklahoma, was listed on the National Register of Historic Places in 1983.

It is a three-story frame house built in 1910-11 by master craftsman Leigh Broughton for R.M. McFarlin.

References

National Register of Historic Places in Hughes County, Oklahoma
Houses completed in 1910